United Nations Security Council Resolution 244, adopted unanimously on December 22, 1967, after reaffirming previous resolutions on the topic the Council extended the stationing in Cyprus of the United Nations Peacekeeping Force in Cyprus for an additional 3 months, now ending on March 26, 1968.  The Council also called upon the parties directly concerned to continue to act with the utmost restraint and to co-operate fully with the peacekeeping force.

This is the first of the resolutions regarding the stationing of the force since 1965 which did not express the hope that it would be removed at the end of the extended stationing.

See also
Cyprus dispute
List of United Nations Security Council Resolutions 201 to 300 (1965–1971)

References
Text of the Resolution at undocs.org

External links
 

 0244
 0244
December 1967 events